José Vicente Lledó Samper (born 14 December 1971) is a Spanish football manager and former player who played as a central defender. He is the current manager of Hércules CF's Juvenil squad.

Playing career
Born in Alicante, Valencian Community, Lledó grew in local Hércules CF's youth system, going on to represent the club in all three major levels of Spanish football and appear in more than 250 official matches in the process. During his 13-year career he also played for amateurs Mutxamel CF, Recreativo de Huelva of Segunda División and Torrellano CF in Tercera División.

Lledó contributed with 34 appearances (33 starts, nearly 3,000 minutes of action) and three goals in the 1995–96 season as his main side won the league championship and returned to La Liga after an absence of ten years. He made his debut in the competition on 1 September 1996, playing the full 90 minutes in a 2–1 home win against CF Extremadura, and was again first-choice as the campaign ended in immediate relegation back.

Coaching career
Lledó worked as head coach exclusively at amateur level. With Hércules, he began as assistant to former club teammate Josip Višnjić in 2002–03, and also had spells as youth and B-team coach. Lledó also managed FC Jove Español San Vicente.

References

External links

1971 births
Living people
Footballers from Alicante
Spanish footballers
Association football defenders
La Liga players
Segunda División players
Segunda División B players
Tercera División players
Hércules CF players
Recreativo de Huelva players
Spanish football managers
Tercera División managers
Tercera Federación managers